How Do You Measure a Year? is a 2021 American short documentary film  directed by Jay Rosenblatt. The documentary film is about father-daughter relationship. The title comes from lyrics of the track "Seasons of Love" of the 1996 Pulitzer Prize-winning musical Rent. The film is nominated for 95th Academy Awards in Academy Award for Best Documentary Short Film category. It was also screened in August 2021 at 74th Locarno Film Festival.

Summary 
The documentary is about relationship of a father and his daughter via home movies. The father films his daughter every year on her birthday, asking the same questions. The girl goes from a toddler to a young woman with all the beautiful and awkward stages in between while the father-daughter relationship evolves in all its complexities.

Cast
 Ella Rosenblatt
 Jay Rosenblatt

Release
The film had its world premiere on August 13, 2021 at 74th Locarno Film Festival. Prior to that, the film was screened at 62nd Kraków Film Festival which took place from 29 May to 12 June 2022 in Kraków, Poland. It won Golden Dragon award for the best short film in the festival.

Reception
Chris Esper writing in Film Threat graded the film 9/10 and opined that the film records life and time uniquely and beautifully. Esper praising the film stated, "A home movie that leaves the viewer with a big grin and perhaps even reflective on their own life."

Accolades 
It was selected for Academy Award for Best Documentary Short Film and subsequently shortlisted and nominated for 95th Academy Awards in said category.

See also
 Anna: 6–18 (1994) – a feature film using the same concept, by Russian director Nikita Mikhalkov
Rent – the title comes from a lyric from the 1996 musical

References

External links
 
 
 

2021 films
2021 short documentary films
2020s English-language films
American short documentary films
2020s American films
Collage film
Films directed by Jay Rosenblatt
Films about father–daughter relationships
Documentary films about children
Documentary films about adolescence
Documentary films about families